USS Berwind (SP-1671) was a United States Navy patrol vessel briefly in service during 1917.

Berwind was built as a civilian motorboat of the same name in 1912 by the Atlantic Boat and Motor Works. On 8 October 1917, the U.S. Navy acquired her from her owner, the Berwind Fuel Company of Duluth, Minnesota, for use as a section patrol boat during World War I. She was given the section patrol number SP-1671.

Assigned to the 9th Naval District for use in patrolling the Great Lakes, Berwind was enrolled on the list of the districts vessels on 20 October 1917. However, she quickly proved unsuitable for naval use, and the Navy returned her to the Berwind Fuel Company on 5 November 1917.

Notes

References
 
 SP-1671 Berwind at Department of the Navy Naval History and Heritage Command Online Library of Selected Images: U.S. Navy Ships -- Listed by Hull Number: "SP" #s and "ID" #s -- World War I Era Patrol Vessels and other Acquired Ships and Craft numbered from ID # 1600 through ID # 1699
 NavSource Online: Section Patrol Craft Photo Archive Berwind (SP 1671)

Patrol vessels of the United States Navy
World War I patrol vessels of the United States
1912 ships
Great Lakes ships